Riga Film Museum is the only museum of its kind in Latvia. It holds various exhibitions that display different aspects of cinema art, actors and film history. The museum was founded in 1988 and is located in two buildings: an 18th-century building located on 10 Peitavas Street in Vecrīga, and the building of Eduards Smiļģis' Theater Museum on 1 Talsu Street in Pārdaugava.

History 
The idea to establish the Film Museum in Riga came about during the traditional cinema forum called ”Kino Diena” (English: "Film Day") in 1986. The leaders of this project were Augusts Sukuts, Inga Pērkone-Redoviča, and Juris Civjans. They managed to start a museum by getting a permission from the Soviet Union cinema organization.

Throughout the years following Latvia’s independence, the Riga Film Museum has been a part of different institutions. It was a part of the National Film Centre of Latvia until 2010 when it was turned over to the Latvian Academy of Culture.

The Film Museum has relocated various times before settling to the current building in the Old Town. It was once in the rooms of ”Riga Video Centre”, the ”Latvian State Archive of Audiovisual Documents”, the ”Riga Film Studio” and the former ”Museum of Illegal Press” on Krāslavas Street.

Permanent exhibition "Behind the Screen" 
The exhibition “Behind the Screen” welcomes to the other side of the screen and offers to  take a look into the filmmaking process, see what cameras are used to shoot films, what projectors they are screened on, how film technologies have changed over time, what professions are involved in making a film happen. All this world is yours to explore through the prism of film history in Latvia. Just a couple of months after the very first film screening in the world film showings already were happening here, in the 1920s enterprising folks started making their own films, in the 1930s created their own sound recording equipment, and for several decades kept a structured film production system running, with several hundred professionals involved.

In “Behind the Screen” museum offers a practical and historical view of how film evolved in Latvia, with focus on the process – the things we don’t notice when looking at the screen.

Cinema Paths of Riga 
Cinema Paths of Riga offers an opportunity for tourists and locals to learn about the history of Latvian cinema and the history of Riga. The Cinema Paths of Riga map displays a timeline of Latvian cinema history, actors, shows, and shooting locations, like that of the movie ‘Where is the Truth? The Tragedy of the Jewish College Girl” which was made in 1913. The Cinema Paths of Riga allows people to dwell into the history of cinema in Latvia. It helps people to learn about local movies, actors and Riga.

The capital city of Latvia is a cinematic city. It has been a film-making centre for Latvian and foreign filmmakers. Movies shown throughout Europe (in cities such as Berlin and London) are oftentimes set in Riga because of its beautiful architecture and style. The city can reveal hidden secrets and provide different perspectives on life.

Educational Programs in the Riga Film Museum

Lecture for children: ”What is Cinema?”
This lecture helps children to learn about cinema and develops their creative thinking. Moving phenomenon, optical illusions, the birth of theater, mystery, horror, and comedy film are explored for young, kindergarten and elementary school aged students. The theme for grades 1-6 is visual art, which includes studies about the line, silhouette, movement, form, experiment, setting, location and surroundings of movies as well as the introduction to different artworks in the museum exposition. The classes are held in Latvian or Russian.

Classes for Older Students
This class is for middle and high school students. Classes for the older age group involve discussions about ethics, responsibility and the individual responsibility. Students will watch a documentary called ”Ten Minutes Older” by Herz Frank.  The theme for this class goes well with cultural studies to discuss the importance of values in life.
The discussions on the above-mentioned topics will prepare the students for filling out an assignment: a review or critique of the film. A class in the museum is a great opportunity to change the learning environment and to combine theory with real life situations.

People, Government, Freedom, and Cinema
This class is for students in grades 10-12. The class discusses the effects of totalitarian government on the lives of people and the freedom of expression by watching movie fragments in the Latvian Cultural Canon.
During the classes students will study Soviet censorship, as well as study the Cultural Canon movement and the movies associated with it. Students will watch three movie fragments that were made in the years 1961-1988.

External links
Official website

Museums in Riga
Cinema museums
Cinema of Latvia
Museums established in 1988
1988 establishments in Latvia